Morten Nielsen (born 14 March 1960) is a Danish sailor. He competed in the Star event at the 1980 Summer Olympics.

References

External links
 

1960 births
Living people
Danish male sailors (sport)
Olympic sailors of Denmark
Sailors at the 1980 Summer Olympics – Star
Sportspeople from Copenhagen